Six Feet Under is an American drama television series created and produced by Alan Ball. It premiered on the premium network HBO in the United States on June 3, 2001, and ended on August 21, 2005, spanning 63 episodes across five seasons. It depicts the lives of the Fisher family, who run a funeral home in Los Angeles, along with their friends and lovers.

The ensemble drama stars Peter Krause, Michael C. Hall, Frances Conroy, Lauren Ambrose, Freddy Rodriguez, Mathew St. Patrick, and Rachel Griffiths as the central characters. It was produced by Actual Size Films and The Greenblatt/Janollari Studio, and was shot on location in Los Angeles and in Hollywood studios.

Six Feet Under received widespread critical acclaim, particularly for its writing and acting, and consistently drew high ratings for the HBO network. It is widely regarded as one of the greatest television series of all time. The show's finale has also been described as one of the greatest television series finales. The series won numerous awards, including nine Emmy Awards, three Screen Actors Guild Awards, three Golden Globe Awards, and a Peabody Award.

Show synopsis 

The show stars Peter Krause as Nate Fisher, whose funeral director father (Richard Jenkins) dies and bequeaths ownership of Fisher & Sons Funeral Home to Nate and his other son David (Michael C. Hall). The Fisher clan also includes widow Ruth Fisher (Frances Conroy) and daughter Claire Fisher (Lauren Ambrose). Other regulars include mortician and family friend Federico Diaz (Freddy Rodriguez), Nate's on-again/off-again girlfriend Brenda Chenowith (Rachel Griffiths), and David's long-term boyfriend Keith Charles (Mathew St. Patrick).

On one level, the show is a conventional family drama, dealing with such issues as interpersonal relationships, dysfunction, infidelity, personal growth, and religion. At the same time, it is distinguished by its focus on the topic of death, which it explores on personal, religious, and philosophical levels. Each episode begins with a death, the cause of which ranges from heart attack to murder to accidental death or sudden infant death syndrome. That death usually sets the thematic tone for each episode, allowing the characters to reflect on their current fortunes and misfortunes in a way that is illuminated by the death and its aftermath. The show also uses dark humor and surrealism throughout its seasons.

A recurring plot device consists of a character having an imaginary conversation with the deceased; for example, Nate, David, and Federico sometimes "converse" with the deceased at the beginning of the episode, while the corpse is being embalmed, or during funeral planning or the funeral itself. Sometimes, the characters converse with other deceased characters, most notably Nathaniel Fisher Sr. The show's creator Alan Ball said this represents the living characters' internal dialogues expressed in the form of external conversations.

Production

Concept 
Although overall plots and characters were created by Alan Ball, reports conflict on how the series was conceived. In one instance, Ball stated that he came up with the premise of the show after the deaths of his sister and father. However, in an interview on the series' DVD collection, he intimated that HBO entertainment president Carolyn Strauss had proposed the idea to him. In a copyright-infringement lawsuit, screenwriter Gwen O'Donnell asserted that she was the original source of the idea that later passed through Strauss to Ball; the U.S. Court of Appeals for the Ninth Circuit, proceeding on the assumption that this assertion was true, rejected her claim.

Airing on a premium cable network allowed the series to explore darker themes than would have been possible on other networks. Ball stated in an interview:

Major themes 
The show focuses on human mortality, the symbiotic nature of life and death feeding off each other, the death industry, and the lives of those who deal with it on a daily basis. When discussing the concept of the show, creator Ball elaborates on the foremost questions the show's pilot targeted:

Six Feet Under introduces the Fisher family as the basis on which to explore these questions. Throughout its five-season, 63-episode run, major characters experience crises which are in direct relation to their environment and the grief they have experienced. Alan Ball again relates these experiences, as well as the choice of the series' title, to the persistent subtext of the program:

Cultural critic Sally Munt commented: "one might risk saying [the show] has an uncanny, or queer rendition of class positions and relations". New York magazine opined that the show "carefully avoided moralism" but there were times where it "felt like a message" that "death has a terrible timing" and it could also be a "karmic gift" for some. Creator Alan Ball refuted this claim by asserting that there was no message in the story but only a recognition that death comes in the middle of "messy things" and doesn't wait for us to sort our lives.

Setting 
Exteriors for the Fisher home were shot at 2302 West 25th Street and the intersection of Arlington Avenue, in the West Adams neighborhood of Los Angeles. In season five, episode one, Rico mentions that he grew up "in West Adams, near where I work."

Crew 
Creator Alan Ball also served as executive producer and showrunner for the entire series run. Robert Greenblatt and David Janollari executive produced the series, as the Greenblatt Janollari Studio was one of the production companies. The other producers were Lori Jo Nemhauser and Robert Del Valle.

The writing staff included Ball, who wrote nine episodes over the series run, including the pilot episode and the series finale. Writers who were on staff for the entire series run included Rick Cleveland, who wrote eight episodes and became an executive producer in the fifth season; Kate Robin, who wrote eight episodes and became a supervising producer in the fifth season; and Bruce Eric Kaplan, who wrote seven episodes and became an executive producer in the fourth season. Christian Williams was just on staff for the first season, writing two episodes. Both Laurence Andries and Christian Taylor wrote three episodes each during their run on the series for the first two seasons, and they also served as producers. Scott Buck and Joey Soloway joined in the second season, staying on staff for the rest of the series, and each wrote seven episodes. Buck became a co-executive producer in the fourth season, and Soloway became a co-executive producer in the fifth season. The last set of writers to join the staff were Craig Wright and Nancy Oliver in the third season. Wright wrote six episodes and became a producer in the fifth season and Oliver wrote five episodes and became a co-producer in the fifth season.

Ball also directed the most episodes, directing the pilot and each of the season finales. Dan Attias also directed six episodes, from seasons two to five. Kathy Bates (who also played Bettina on the series), Michael Cuesta, Rodrigo García, and Jeremy Podeswa each directed five episodes. Michael Engler, Daniel Minahan, and Alan Poul (who also served as an executive producer for the series) each directed four episodes. Miguel Arteta directed three episodes and Nicole Holofcener directed two episodes. Single-episode directors included Peter Care, Alan Caso, Lisa Cholodenko, Allen Coulter, Adam Davidson, Mary Harron, Joshua Marston, Jim McBride, Karen Moncrieff, John Patterson, Matt Shakman, Alan Taylor, Rose Troche, and Peter Webber.

Music 
The series' main theme, written by composer Thomas Newman, won a 2002 Emmy Award for Outstanding Main Title Theme Music and two Grammy Awards in 2003 for Best Instrumental Composition and Best Instrumental Arrangement.

The production sound from seasons three through five was mixed by Bo Harwood, and was nominated in 2004 for a Cinema Audio Society Award.

Seasons two through five featured a promotional teaser trailer prior to the premiere of that season. The songs featured in each season's trailer were "Heaven" by Lamb for season two; "A Rush of Blood to the Head" by Coldplay for season three; "Feeling Good" by Nina Simone for season four; and "Breathe Me" by Sia for season five, which is also used for montage in the series finale. All these songs are included in either of two soundtracks for the show.

The episode recaps for the first two seasons feature the song "Nothing Lies Still Long" by Pell Mell. The episode previews for the first and fifth seasons feature the Six Feet Under title theme, while the other seasons feature the Rae & Christian remix version of the title theme.

Music supervision for the entire run of the series was provided by Gary Calamar and Thomas Golubic, who were also credited as producers for the two soundtrack albums.

Cast and characters

Main 

 Peter Krause as Nate Fisher – the eldest child, he is in search of meaning, while facing the prospect of his own death.
 Michael C. Hall as David Fisher – the middle child, he is uptight and coming to terms with being gay.
 Frances Conroy as Ruth Fisher – the matriarch, she is emotionally repressed and trying to form a new, independent life.
 Lauren Ambrose as Claire Fisher – the youngest child, she is rebellious and creative.
 Freddy Rodriguez as Federico Diaz – the business partner of the Fishers, he is a family man.
 Mathew St. Patrick as Keith Charles – David's on-off significant other, he is a member of the LAPD.
 Rachel Griffiths as Brenda Chenowith – Nate's on-off significant other, she struggles with depression.
 Jeremy Sisto as Billy Chenowith – Brenda's younger brother, he has bipolar disorder (main season 1; recurring seasons 2–5).
James Cromwell as George Sibley – a geology professor, he is Ruth's second husband (recurring season 3; main seasons 4–5).
 Justina Machado as Vanessa Diaz – Federico's wife, she is a licensed vocational nurse (recurring seasons 1–4; main season 5).

Recurring 
 Richard Jenkins as Nathaniel Fisher Sr. – the patriarch of the Fisher family, he dies at the start, but appears in dream sequences and flashbacks (seasons 1–5)
 Joanna Cassidy as Margaret Chenowith – Brenda and Billy's psychologist mother (seasons 1–5)
 Giancarlo Rodriguez as Julio Diaz – Federico and Vanessa's son (seasons 1–5)
 Tim Maculan as Father Jack – the priest at the Fisher's family church (seasons 1–5)
 Eric Balfour as Gabriel Dimas – Claire's high-school boyfriend, and a chronic drug user (seasons 1–3)
 Robert Foxworth as Dr. Bernard Chenowith – Brenda and Billy's psychiatrist father (seasons 1–3)
 Ed O'Ross as Nikolai – a boyfriend of Ruth's when she worked as a florist (seasons 1–2, 5)
 Marina Black as Parker McKenna – a friend of Claire's during high school (seasons 1–2)
 David Norona as Gary Deitman – Claire's counselor (seasons 1–2)
 Gary Hershberger as Matthew Gilardi – an employee of a major funeral home organization, who attempts to buy out Fisher & Sons (seasons 1–2)
 Ed Begley Jr., as Hiram Gunderson – Hiram, a hair stylist, had an affair with Ruth while she was married to Nathaniel (seasons 1 and 5)
 Illeana Douglas as Angela – Angela temporarily replaced Federico in Fisher & Sons (seasons 1 and 5)
 Dina Waters as Tracy Montrose Blair (season 1)
 Patricia Clarkson as Sarah O'Connor – Ruth's younger sister, an artist who lives in Topanga Canyon (seasons 2–5)
 Lili Taylor as Lisa Kimmel Fisher – Nate's former roommate, his first wife, and mother of his daughter Maya (seasons 2–5)
 Melissa Marsala as Angelica – Vanessa's sister, she has a contentious relationship with her brother-in-law Federico (seasons 2–5)
 Aysia Polk as Taylor Charles – Keith's niece, she is under his care (seasons 2–5)
 John Paul Pitoc as Phil – Claire's boyfriend briefly and works at the crematorium (seasons 2–3)
 Kellie Waymire as Melissa – a high-class prostitute whom Brenda befriends (season 2)
 Nicki Micheaux as Karla Charles – Keith's sister and Taylor's mother, and a drug addict (season 2)
 Julie White as Mitzi Dalton-Huntley – an employee of a major funeral home organization, which attempts to buy out Fisher & Sons (seasons 1–2)
 Kathy Bates as Bettina – Sarah's friend and caretaker, she becomes a good friend of Ruth's (seasons 3–5)
 Peter Macdissi as Olivier Castro-Staal – Claire's professor at art school and Margaret Chenowith's lover (seasons 3–5)
 Ben Foster as Russell Corwin – Claire's boyfriend during art school (seasons 3–5)
 Brenna Tosh and Bronwyn Tosh as Maya Fisher – Nate and Lisa's young daughter (seasons 3–5)
 Rainn Wilson as Arthur Martin – a young intern from mortuary school, he works for the funeral home (seasons 3–5)
 Justin Theroux as Joe – Brenda's neighbor, and boyfriend during season four (seasons 3–4)
 Idalis DeLeón as Sophia – an exotic dancer with whom Federico has an affair (seasons 3–4)
 Catherine O'Hara as Carol Ward – Lisa's boss, a neurotic motion-picture producer (seasons 3 and 5)
 Sprague Grayden as Anita Miller – Claire's friend from art school (seasons 4–5)
 Peter Facinelli as Jimmy – Claire's friend from art school and one-time lover (seasons 4–5)
 Mena Suvari as Edie – a free-spirited lesbian artist and friend of Claire's from art school (season 4)
 Michael Weston as Jake – a mentally unstable crack addict, he kidnaps and assaults David (seasons 4–5)
 Tina Holmes as Maggie Sibley – George's daughter, she has an affair with Nate (seasons 4–5)
 Matt Malloy as Roger Pasquese – Keith's employer, a movie producer (seasons 4–5)
 Julie Dretzin as Barb – Lisa's sister (seasons 4–5)
 Jeff Yagher as Hoyt – Lisa's brother-in-law (season 4)
 Michelle Trachtenberg as Celeste – a pop star under Keith's security (season 4)
 Bobby Cannavale as Javier – Keith's colleague (season 4)
 Chris Messina as Ted Fairwell – a lawyer at Claire's temporary office job and her boyfriend during season five (season 5)
 Kendré Berry as Durrell Charles-Fisher – an adopted son of David and Keith's (season 5)
 C. J. Sanders as Anthony Charles-Fisher – an adopted son of David and Keith's (season 5)
 Anne Ramsay as Jackie Feldman – Brenda's colleague and friend (season 5)

Family tree

Episodes

Reception

Critical reception 
Six Feet Under received widespread critical acclaim, particularly for its writing and acting. It is widely regarded as one of the greatest television series of all time, included on best-of lists by Time, The Guardian, and Empire. The show's finale has also been described as one of the greatest television series finales.

Six Feet Under received critical acclaim for most of its run, with the exception of the fourth season, which received more mixed reviews. The first season holds a rating of 74 out of 100 at Metacritic based on 23 reviews. Early reviews of the series were positive, prior to the screening of the pilot episode; Steve Oxman of Variety stated, "Six Feet Under is a smart, brooding, fanciful character-driven ensemble piece about a family in the funeral biz." Following the series premiere, Barry Garron of The Hollywood Reporter commented that the series' "examination of family life through the prism of a mortuary business, combines sardonic humor with poignant drama and comes up with a unique tone and style, in itself quite an accomplishment for any TV series. It is fearless in its approach to storytelling and, far more often than not, succeeds in the risks it takes" and "there is much to admire about this series, including top-notch performances, artful direction and creative storytelling that employs various techniques, including dream sequences and parody commercials. Best of all, though, is Ball’s introspection and the insight he provides about society, the funeral industry, and family relationships."

Bill Carter of The New York Times wrote, "Six Feet Under certainly got enthusiastic reviews, almost universally glowing notices about the rich characterizations and quirky humor shaped by the show's celebrated creator, Alan Ball, the Academy Award-winning writer of the film American Beauty." In an early response from HBO executive Chris Albrecht, he announced in regards to the viewers, that they are "totally thrilled with the series."

On Rotten Tomatoes, the first season has a 90% approval rating with an average score of 8/10 based on 39 reviews, with a critical consensus of, "Six Feet Unders unusual setting provides a perfect backdrop for the macabre meditations on mortality made by its brilliant, brooding cast." The second season has a 79% approval rating with an average score of 9.33/10 based on 14 reviews, with a critical consensus of, "Six Feet Unders deliberately paced second season is less endearing than the first, but the engaging ensemble remain reason enough to watch." The third season has a 90% approval rating with an average score of 7.56/10 based on 20 reviews, with a critical consensus of, "Six Feet Unders third season dials down the comedy in favor of creepier narratives – a challenge its cast is more than up to." The fourth season has a 50% approval rating with an average score of 5.58/10 based on 10 reviews, with a critical consensus of, "Six Feet Under overreaches in its fourth season, with twists and story arcs that feel more contrived than compelling, though its willingness to venture boldly into the dark also proves occasionally exhilarating." The fifth season has a 97% approval rating with an average score of 8.86/10 based on 37 reviews, with a critical consensus of, "Six Feet Under offers a fitting end for the Fishers by concluding the way it began: an unexpectedly beautiful rumination on life, death and grief."

The series finale is considered one of the greatest endings in television history. In a 2015 interview with Alan Ball, Peter Krause, Michael C. Hall, and Lauren Ambrose for The Hollywood Reporter, to mark 10 years since the show's ending, they described it as the "finale that would not die". Megan Vick of The Hollywood Reporter said, "The idea of flashing forward to depict how each member of the Fishers and their loved ones would pass on seemed revolutionary in 2005, but Ball – who created the series and would write and direct its final episode – uses another word for it – inevitable."

Ratings

Awards and nominations 

At the 2002 Primetime Emmy Awards, the series received 23 nominations for its first two seasons, including a nomination for Outstanding Drama Series. Series creator Alan Ball won for Outstanding Directing for a Drama Series for the pilot episode and Patricia Clarkson won for Outstanding Guest Actress in a Drama Series. The rest of the ensemble cast, including Michael C. Hall, Peter Krause, Frances Conroy, Rachel Griffiths, Freddy Rodriguez, and Lauren Ambrose all received acting nominations. Guest actors Lili Taylor and Illeana Douglas received nominations in the guest-acting category. The series received 16 nominations at the 2003 Primetime Emmy Awards for its third season, including a nomination for Outstanding Drama Series. Krause,  Conroy,  Ambrose,  Griffiths, James Cromwell, and Kathy Bates all received acting nominations. Alan Poul was nominated for directing for the episode "Nobody Sleeps", and Craig Wright was nominated for writing for the episode "Twilight". The series received five nominations at the 2005 Primetime Emmy Awards for its fourth season, including Outstanding Drama Series and Outstanding Lead Actress in a Drama Series for Frances Conroy. The series received nine nominations at the 2006 Primetime Emmy Awards for its fifth and final season. Patricia Clarkson won for the second time for Outstanding Guest Actress in a Drama Series, and Krause,  Conroy, and Joanna Cassidy received acting nominations. Ball was nominated for writing and directing for the series finale episode "Everyone's Waiting".

For the Golden Globe Awards, the series won for Best Drama Series in 2001, and received nominations in 2002 and 2003. Peter Krause was nominated for Best Actor in a Drama Series in 2001 and 2002. Rachel Griffiths won for Best Supporting Actress in a Series, Miniseries, or TV Film in 2001, and received a nomination in 2002 in the Lead Actress category. Frances Conroy won for Best Actress in a Drama Series in 2003.

For the Screen Actors Guild Awards, the cast won for Outstanding Ensemble in a Drama Series in 2002 and 2003, and received nominations in 2001, 2004, and 2005. Peter Krause was nominated for Outstanding Male Actor in a Drama Series in 2001 and 2003. Frances Conroy won for Outstanding Female Actor in a Drama Series in 2003.

The series won a Peabody Award for general excellence in 2002 "for its unsettling yet powerfully humane explorations of life and death".

Home media

DVDs 
The first season was released in a VHS box set. All five seasons are available on DVD in individual box sets and in a collected volume.

Soundtracks 
Two soundtrack albums, featuring music that had appeared in the series, were released:
 Six Feet Under (March 5, 2002)
 Six Feet Under, Vol. 2: Everything Ends (June 21, 2005)

Books

Streaming 
The complete series is available from various streaming sites including HBO Max, Amazon Video, Disney+ Hotstar.

See also 
 Family Plots – a reality TV series about a Poway, California-based funeral home

References

External links 

 
 
 

 
2001 American television series debuts
2005 American television series endings
2000s American drama television series
2000s American LGBT-related drama television series
Adultery in television
Best Drama Series Golden Globe winners
Bipolar disorder in fiction
Emmy Award-winning programs
English-language television shows
Funeral homes in fiction
HBO original programming
Outstanding Performance by an Ensemble in a Drama Series Screen Actors Guild Award winners
Peabody Award-winning television programs
Primetime Emmy Award-winning television series
Serial drama television series
Television series about dysfunctional families
Television series about widowhood
Television series by Warner Bros. Television Studios
Television shows about death
Television shows set in Los Angeles
Television shows filmed in Los Angeles
Television series about siblings